Jordan Lynch (born October 3, 1990) is a former American football quarterback and running back. After playing college football at Northern Illinois, where he was a finalist for the Heisman Trophy in 2013, and going undrafted in the 2014 NFL Draft, Lynch had stints with the Chicago Bears of the National Football League (NFL) and Edmonton Eskimos of the Canadian Football League (CFL).

Lynch is currently the head football coach of Mount Carmel High School in his hometown of Chicago, Illinois. He succeeded Frank Lenti, who was the coach of the program for 34 years.

High school career
After graduating from St. Christina Elementary School in the Mt. Greenwood area of Chicago, Lynch attended Chicago (IL) Mount Carmel and graduated in 2009. He played varsity for three years under coach Frank Lenti. He started two of those three years.

College career
At the beginning of his college career at NIU in DeKalb, IL Lynch was redshirted in 2009. He was the backup quarterback to Chandler Harnish in 2010 and 2011. During those two years he completed 19 of 26 passes for 179 yards and two touchdowns. He also rushed for 608 yards on 76 carries with six touchdowns.

In 2012, he became NIU's starting quarterback. During the 2012 marathon MAC Championship Game, Lynch increased his rushing stats to 1,771 yards on 271 carries, breaking the previous NCAA record for rushing yards in a season by a quarterback set by Denard Robinson. He finished the season with 1,815 yards. Lynch finished 7th in Heisman Voting at the end of 2012, and won the Vern Smith Leadership Award, which is awarded to the best player in the Mid-American Conference.

On October 19, 2013, Lynch broke the record for the most rushing yards by a quarterback in one game, finishing with 316 yards and three touchdowns, en route to winning the Walter Camp National Player of the Week. On October 26 against Eastern Michigan, Lynch was responsible for six total touchdowns, throwing four, running for one, and catching a touchdown, gaining 339 total yards.  On November 26, 2013, in Dekalb, Illinois, Lynch broke the single-game quarterback rushing yards record again, rushing for 321 yards versus the Western Michigan University Broncos.  On December 9, 2013, Lynch was announced as a finalist for the 2013 Heisman Trophy. He finished third in the voting that was announced on December 14, 2013. On December 17, Lynch was selected as a first-team All-American. He finished the season with 1,920 rushing yards, which broke his record from the previous season.

College statistics

NCAA records
 Second most rushing yards by a quarterback in a season: 1,920 (2013)
 Most 100-yard rushing games by a quarterback in a season: 12 (2012)
 Second most rushing yards per game by a quarterback in a season: 137.1 (2013)

Professional career

Chicago Bears
Lynch was eligible for the 2014 NFL Draft, but was not drafted. The Chicago Bears signed him to a contract as a running back shortly after the draft concluded. The Bears released Lynch on August 29, 2014.

Edmonton Eskimos
On January 14, 2015, Lynch signed with the Edmonton Eskimos of the Canadian Football League.

Lynch scored his first CFL touchdown against the Ottawa RedBlacks on Thursday, July 9. Lynch was part of the Eskimos team that won the 2015 Grey Cup, and scored the game-winning touchdown with 3:22 remaining in the game for the Eskimos.

On March 8, 2017, Lynch announced his retirement from professional football. The same day, the Northern Illinois University Athletic Department announced that Lynch had been hired as a running backs coach for the Huskies football program.

Coaching career

Northern Illinois University
On March 8, 2017, NIU hired Lynch as the teams running backs coach. Lynch served under his former head coach Rod Carey, who was hired as NIU's head coach after Lynch's junior season.

Mount Carmel High School
In December 2017, Mount Carmel High School in Chicago announced that Lynch would be returning to the school as the team's head coach. He replaced Frank Lenti, who has been the head coach of the program for 34 years and won 12 state championships, in a move that received some shock and criticism from local media and fans.

In November 2019, Lynch led the Caravan to their 13th IHSA Football State Championship, defeating Nazareth Academy 37-13. Lynch's younger brother Justin, the Caravan's quarterback, rushed for all five Mount Carmel touchdowns in the victory.

In November 2022, Lynch Led the Caravan to their 14th IHSA Football State Championship, and 26th overall, over Batavia, the Caravan′s second straight year eliminating the Bulldogs from the playoffs.

References

External links
 Edmonton Eskimos profile
 Northern Illinois profile

1990 births
Living people
American football quarterbacks
American players of Canadian football
Canadian football quarterbacks
Chicago Bears players
Edmonton Elks players
Northern Illinois Huskies football coaches
Northern Illinois Huskies football players
High school football coaches in Illinois
Players of American football from Chicago
Players of Canadian football from Chicago
Coaches of American football from Illinois